Gelophaula siraea is a species of moth of the family Tortricidae. It is found in New Zealand.

The wingspan is about 23 mm. The forewings are pale greyish, mixed with yellow whitish and more yellowish tinged towards the dorsum. The hindwings are whitish, tinged greyish on the dorsal half.

References

Moths described in 1885
Archipini
Moths of New Zealand
Endemic fauna of New Zealand
Taxa named by Edward Meyrick
Endemic moths of New Zealand